Tiziano Pagan De Paganis (Verona, 1858 – Bologna, 1932) was an Italian painter, mainly of landscapes and genre subjects.

He studied at the Academy of Fine Arts of Bologna, where in 1876 he was awarded a diploma for ornamentation. At the 1878 Milan exposition, he displayed the two landscapes: Le due torri Asinelli e Garisenda and Il Foro romano. In 1881 at Florence, he exhibited Fra due battute d'aspetto and Una lezione meritata. He remained a resident of Bologna. At the 1885 Promotrice of Bologna, he exhibited: Un ottimo amico; Un assalto impreveduto'''; Angelus Domini. At the 1888 Esposition at Bologna, he sent: Il Rio dì Porretta; Fiori; Ricreazione''; and various drawings and designs.
 He also painted portraits, including miniatures of persons in a landscape.

References

1858 births
1932 deaths
Painters from Verona
Painters from Bologna
19th-century Italian painters
Italian male painters
20th-century Italian painters
Italian landscape painters
Italian genre painters
Accademia di Belle Arti di Bologna alumni
19th-century Italian male artists
20th-century Italian male artists